Brooke Baldwin (born July 12, 1979) is an American journalist, television host and author who was at CNN from 2008 until 2021. Baldwin hosted CNN Newsroom with Brooke Baldwin, which aired from 3pm to 4pm ET on weekdays.

Early life and education
Brooke Baldwin was born in Atlanta, Georgia, where she attended The Westminster Schools, a private college-preparatory school. In 2001, she graduated with bachelor's degrees in Spanish from the University of North Carolina at Chapel Hill and in journalism from the university's Hussman School of Journalism and Media. As an undergraduate, she also studied abroad at the Universidad Iberoamericana in Mexico City.

Career
Baldwin began her career in 2001 at WVIR-TV in Charlottesville, Virginia, and later became the morning anchor at WOWK-TV in the Huntington and Charleston, West Virginia area. She later joined WTTG in Washington, D.C. as lead reporter for the 10 p.m. newscast.

CNN
Baldwin joined CNN in 2008 and was based out of CNN's Atlanta world headquarters until 2014. She anchored CNN Newsroom with Brooke Baldwin on weekdays and has been based in New York City since 2014.

On July 8, 2011, Baldwin co-anchored CNN's special coverage of the final launch of Space Shuttle Atlantis (STS-135) from Kennedy Space Center.

Baldwin's documentary To Catch a Serial Killer won a Silver World Medal for Best Investigative Report at the New York Festivals International Television & Film Awards in 2012. She was nominated for an Emmy for her coverage of the New York City chokehold death protests in wake of Eric Garner's death 2014.

She covered President Obama's second inauguration in January 2013 from Washington, D.C.

In 2015 Baldwin hosted a town hall in Washington, D.C. on gun violence, for which she was a Peabody Award finalist.

Baldwin was criticized during the 2015 Baltimore protests when she incorrectly attributed comments she heard that veterans were responsible for the unrest – saying soldiers who become police officers "are coming back from war, they don't know the communities, and they're ready to do battle." She later apologized via Twitter and on-air the next day. In The Washington Post, Erik Wemple wrote, "CNN's Brooke Baldwin shows rest of media how to apologize".

In June 2016, Baldwin reported live from Orlando, Florida, covering the victims and survivors of the Orlando nightclub shooting.

On January 20, 2017, she covered President Trump's inauguration.

On February 16, 2021, Baldwin announced that she would leave CNN in mid-April. She hosted her final show on April 16.

New Year's Eve Live
From 2010 to 2020 Baldwin hosted a segment of CNN's New Year's Eve Live with Anderson Cooper, and previously alongside Kathy Griffin, broadcasting live from New Orleans with Don Lemon. Previously, Baldwin hosted from Nashville, Tennessee in 2010 and 2011.

CNN.com

American Woman 
In 2017, CNN commissioned Baldwin's series American Woman featuring Sheryl Crow, Betty White, Ava DuVernay, Diane von Fürstenberg, Issa Rae, Ashley Graham, Tracy Reese, and Pat Benatar.

Huddle
Baldwin published her first book, Huddle: How Women Unlock Their Collective Power in April 2021.  In the book, she interviews multiple women including Ava DuVernay, Stacey Abrams, and Gloria Steinem about the power women have when they join together.

In the media
In April 2015, Variety featured her in "Brooke Baldwin Gives Surprising Boost to CNN". In December 2015, The New York Times interviewed Baldwin after writing an op-ed on CNN.com about covering mass shootings in America. Marie Claire magazine interviewed her on the subject of covering mass shootings.

In 2016, Elle magazine featured Baldwin as one of five female correspondents during the election year of 2016. New York's Downtown magazine featured Baldwin in October 2016.

On Saturday Night Live, Baldwin was parodied in a sketch featuring Cecily Strong and Alec Baldwin in October 2016, the week after the release of the Donald Trump Access Hollywood tape.

In 2017, Baldwin was featured in a Variety magazine article "Women Surge to Top of TV News in Face of Sexism".

Clay Travis incident
On September 15, 2017, Clay Travis appeared as a guest on CNN with Baldwin to discuss free speech, specifically whether ESPN personality Jemele Hill should be fired for calling Donald Trump a "white supremacist" and stating that police officers were "modern day slave catchers" on her personal Twitter page. Travis stated that it would be bad policy on ESPN's part to fire Hill for her private comments, just as it was bad policy when ESPN fired Curt Schilling for comments he made regarding transgender bathrooms on his personal Facebook page. Travis received criticism for using a phrase he commonly used on his radio show when he said "...I'm a First Amendment absolutist - the only two things I 100 percent believe in are the First Amendment and boobs..." Baldwin cut the interview short and later responded, "when I first heard 'boobs' from a grown man on national television (in 2017!!!) my initial thought bubble was: 'Did I hear that correctly??...'"

Speaking engagements
Baldwin hosted the AK100 Club event for the travel agency Abercrombie and Kent, and gave a speech, based upon her March 2015 climb up Mount Kilimanjaro.

Also in 2016, Baldwin presented an award at L'Oréal Paris 11th Annual Women of Worth Celebration. Other presenters included Blake Lively, Andie MacDowell, Diane Keaton, Aimee Mullins, L'Oréal USA president Karen Fondu, Tamron Hall, Arianna Huffington, Liya Kebede, Karlie Kloss and Eva Longoria at The Pierre on November 16 in New York City.

In 2017, Baldwin spoke at the 7th annual Neighbor Celebration in Washington DC for Blue Star Families where former First Lady Rosalynn Carter was honored on March 30, 2017.

Baldwin hosted Mother Nature Network's White House Correspondents' Jam at Hamilton Live, Washington DC in April 2017 – featuring headlining band, The Boxmasters, with actor Billy Bob Thornton and Rolling Stones' keyboardist Chuck Leavell.

Baldwin gave the commencement address at The University of North Carolina at Chapel Hill on May 14, 2017.

Personal life
In July 2017, Baldwin revealed that she was engaged to English producer James Fletcher. They were married in May 2018.

In April 2020, Baldwin was diagnosed with COVID-19, days after CNN colleague Chris Cuomo was diagnosed. Baldwin returned to work on April 27, 2020.

See also
 New Yorkers in journalism

Social media links

References

External links
 Brooke Baldwin CNN profile
 

1979 births
Living people
American television news anchors
American women television journalists
CNN people
The Westminster Schools alumni
Universidad Iberoamericana alumni
UNC Hussman School of Journalism and Media alumni
21st-century American women